"Guilty Conscience" is a song by American rapper Eminem, featuring American hip hop producer Dr. Dre. It was released as the third and final single from Eminem's The Slim Shady LP (1999).  It was also released on his 2005 greatest hits album Curtain Call: The Hits.

Background
The concept for "Guilty Conscience" first arose whilst Dr. Dre and Eminem were at the gym together and discussing potential song ideas. Dr. Dre proposed a collaboration between the two called "Night 'n' Day", in which Dr. Dre would state various lyrics and Eminem would respond with the exact opposite sentiments. Eminem began writing the song upon returning home that evening. Mark Avery, an announcer from a talent agency, was hired to voice the narrator; after Eminem explained to Avery what he wanted him to say, the rest of the song was constructed around his parts.

Critical reception
Allmusic highlighted this song on LP. David Browne noted that Eminem's "coldly-calculated-to-offend alter ego considers date rape".

Music video
The video for "Guilty Conscience" has a nonstop back-beat with a chorus, unlike the album version, and a different narrator, played by actor Robert Culp. The lyrics in the chorus samples the song "I Will Follow Him" by Little Peggy March ("These voices, I hear them. And, when they talk, I'll follow"). The version that aired on MTV eliminated the murder at the end of the song and converted it into an escalating argument between Eminem and Dre with no resolution. The Director's Cut leaves the murder in. The video is produced using the bullet time technique, depicting Eminem and Dr. Dre rapping to the song's protagonists on how to deal with their conflicting situations: including a man's temptation to robbing a liquor store, a college student's urge to have sex with an underage girl at a frat party, and the urge of a construction worker to murder his wife after he catches her cheating with another man. Dr. Dre poses as the "good conscience" and wins the first arguments (Eddie) while Eminem poses as the "evil conscience" and wins the second (Stan). However, in the third argument, which is over the actions Grady (the construction worker) should take when he catches his wife cheating with another man, Eminem's taunting and accusations of hypocrisy coaxes Dr. Dre into agreeing with him that Grady should kill them both and subsequently Dre suggests that Grady should get his gun and murder his wife and her lover. The song contains a sample from the Ronald Stein song "Pigs Go Home" from the soundtrack to the film Getting Straight. Eminem later released "Guilty Conscience" on his greatest hits album, Curtain Call: The Hits. The nonstop back-beat and chorus from the music video were only used in the edited version of the song, but the narrator was not changed. The video won the "Hottest Music Video" award at the Online Hip-Hop Awards in 2000. The video was listed on MuchMusic's 50 Most Controversial Videos at No. 38 for its promotion on how people get crossed with their consciences.

Lawsuit
In September 2003, 70-year-old widow Harlene Stein filed suit against Eminem and Dr. Dre on the grounds that "Guilty Conscience" contains an unauthorized sample of "Pigs Go Home" written for the film Getting Straight by her husband Ronald Stein, who died in 1988.  Although the album's liner notes state that the song contains an interpolation of "Pigs Go Home", Stein is not credited as a co-writer and his wife was not paid royalties for use of the song.  The lawsuit requested 5 percent of the retail list price of 90 percent of all copies of the album sold in America, and 2.5 percent of the retail price of 90 percent of all copies of the album sold internationally. The suit was dismissed in June 2004 for lack of subject matter jurisdiction.

Awards and nominations

Track listing
UK CD1

UK CD2

UK Cassette

German CD single

Notes
 signifies a co-producer.

Charts

Weekly charts

Year-end charts

Certifications

References

External links

Eminem songs
Dr. Dre songs
1999 singles
Song recordings produced by Dr. Dre
Aftermath Entertainment singles
Juvenile sexuality in music
Interscope Records singles
Songs about alcohol
1998 songs
Songs involved in plagiarism controversies
Songs about crime
Songs about fictional male characters